Kumkent is a village in Sozak District in Turkestan Region of Kazakhstan. It is the head of the Kumkent rural district (KATO code - 515643100). Population:  

The archaeological remains of the ancient Kumkent fortification are located to the southwest.

Geography
Kyzylkol lake lies close to the village and the Akzhar lakes lie to the northeast.

References

Populated places in Turkistan Region

ru:Кумкент